The 1990 Chilean telethon was the ninth version of the solidarity campaign conducted in Chile, which took place on 7 and 8 December 1990. The theme of this version was "No-one Left Out."

The poster girl was Daniela Muñoz. The telethon was held after 24 months as in 1989 the event was suspended by presidential and parliamentary elections.

This was the first telethon to be held in Chile after the return to democracy and under the leadership of President Patricio Aylwin.

The final figure came to CL$1,153,291,010.

Sponsors

Artists

Nationals 
  Fernando Ubiergo
  Illapu
  Los Huasos Quincheros
  Rumba 8
  José Luis Arce
  Cecilia Echeñique
  Juan Antonio Labra
  Alberto Plaza
  Giolito y Su Combo
  Eduardo Valenzuela
  Álvaro Scaramelli
  Miguelo
  Los Huasos de Algarrobal
  Luis Mariano
  Los Clásicos
  Buddy Richard
  Beatlemanía
  Carlos Vásquez
  Roberto Viking Valdés
  Antumapu
  Juan Carlos Duque
  Síndrome
  Inti-Illimani
  Gloria Simonetti
  Los Prisioneros
  *Luis Jara
   *Andrea Tessa
   Paolo Salvatore
  Myriam Hernández
 * Singers of the official song "No-one Left Out".

International Artists 
  Amaya Uranga
  Susy González
  Celia Cruz
  Ana Torroja
  María Ovando
  Manny Menito
  Rudy La Scala
  Yolandita Monge
  Qué Pasa
  Xuxa
  Juan Ramón
  Mocedades
  Luz Casal

Comedians 
 Checho Hirane
 El Tufo
 Lucho Arenas Jr.
 Álvaro Salas
 Guiliermo Bruce
 Eduardo Thompson
 Jorge Cruz
 Gilberto Guzmán
 Ricardo Meruane

Magazine 
 Hugo Urrutia's Ballet
 Chamber of Deputies (song)
 BAFOCHI
 Daniel Lencina
 Mago Oli
 Julio Jung (reciter)
 Ballet Ciclodanza
 Trio Allegro

In Children's Section 
 Pipiripao
 Snow White
 Pinocho
 Peter Pan
 La Pintita
 Show de Enza
 Mini Pop
 El Profesor Rossa
 Cachureos

In Adult's Section 
 Tatiana Merino
 Las Corselas
 Rita Riveira
 Bambina
 Bim-Bam-Bum
 Maripepa Nieto

Transmission 
 Telenorte
 UCV Televisión
 Televisión Nacional de Chile
 Megavisión
 Universidad de Chile Televisión
 Universidad Católica de Chile Televisión
 Univisión
 Canal 8 UCV Televisión
 Canal 10 Universidad Austral de Chile
 Red TV Cable

Curiosities 
At 7:45 on Saturday, December 8, 1990, coinciding with the Feast of the Immaculate Conception, Channel 13 and TVN left the live transmission to deliver the mass. For this reason, the News Section was  broadcast only by UCV TV, Channel 8 (La Serena), Channel 10 (Valdivia), Telenorte, Megavisión, Channel 11 and Red TV Cable.

References

External links 
 Ninth Telethon - Banco de Chile's Advertisement
 Ninth Telethon - Summary
 Ninth Telethon - Trío Allegro
 Ninth Telethon - Ciclo Danza
 Ninth Telethon - Closing

Telethon
Chilean telethons